The Institute of Technical Education (ITE) is a post-secondary education institution and statutory board under the purview of the Ministry of Education in Singapore.

Established by the Ministry of Education, it was formerly known as Vocational and Industrial Training Board (VITB). ITE has three colleges, ITE College West located at Choa Chu Kang Grove, ITE College Central located at Ang Mo Kio Drive and ITE College East located at Simei and it offers the National ITE Certificate (NITEC), Higher NITEC, Technical Diploma and Work-Study Diploma. 

Apart from providing vocational education to secondary school graduates, ITE offers apprenticeships for the skilled trades and diplomas in vocational education for skilled technicians and workers in support roles in professions such as accountancy, architecture, business administration, engineering and nursing.

History

1960s to 1970s: Vocational and Industrial Training Board (VITB)
During the 1960s and 1970s, vocational education was managed by two separate statutory boards, the Adult Education Board (AEB) and the Industrial Training Board (ITB). They were merged in 1979 to form the Vocational and Industrial Training Board (VITB). The VITB was formed to promote and develop vocational education.

1992: Institute of Technical Education (ITE)
The Institute of Technical Education (ITE) was established as a post-secondary education institution to improve the employability of vocational trainees and to restructure the VITB's programmes. The government decided that every student in Singapore had to have at least ten years of general education, with technically inclined students filtered into the Normal (Technical) stream in secondary schools as preparation. These students would then attend the ITE after they finished secondary school education.
 1992: Establishment of ITE as Post-Secondary Technical Education Institution.
 1994: Operation of New ITE Bishan Institute.
 1995: Operation of New ITE Headquarters.
 1996: Operation of New ITE Dover Institute.
 1998: Operation of New ITE Balestier Institute, ITE Tampines Institute and ITE Yishun Institute.
 2000: Operation of New ITE Bukit Batok Institute.
 2001: Operation of New ITE MacPherson Institute.
 2002: Launch of eTutor Learning System, eStudent Administration System and new national ITE Certification System (Nitec/Higher Nitec/Master Nitec).
 2003: Launch of ReNEW Initiative for Adult Learners.
 2005: Operation of ITE College East, ITE's first comprehensive college. Establishment of the Info-Comm Centre of Technology, ITE's first centre of technology. Winning of Singapore Quality Award for World-Class Business Excellence.
 2007: Winner of global IBM Innovations Award in Transforming Government.
 2010: Operation of ITE College West, ITE's second comprehensive college.
 2013: ITE College Central, third and final regional campus of ITE was fully operational together with the new ITE Headquarters.

Student intake
Every year, ITE takes in 25% of an annual school cohort, or an intake of about 13,000 students, with an annual enrollment of about 25,000. Full-time students are typically secondary school graduates with the requisite GCE 'N' or 'O' Level qualifications.

Colleges
To refine technical education in Singapore, the "One ITE System, Three Colleges" Model of Education and Governance was introduced in 2005 to merge the 10 satellite campuses into 3 regional colleges.

 ITE College West
 ITE College Central
 ITE College East

Awards
ITE has won a number of local awards as well as international awards. In 2005, it became the first educational institution to be awarded the Singapore Quality Award by Spring Singapore. This award is awarded to world-class organisations that demonstrate the highest standards of business excellence. ITE has also won the Public Service Distinguished Award, awarded by the Prime Minister's office in 2010, as well as the Singapore Innovation Class, awarded by Spring Singapore in 2011.

In 2007, among 30 countries that participated, ITE won the inaugural Harvard-IBM Innovations Award in Transforming Government. This prestigious award was conferred by the Ash Center for Democratic Governance and Innovation of Harvard University and recognises ITE's programmes as having a profound impact on the lives of citizens.

Notable alumni

Entertainment
 Romeo Tan, MediaCorp actor
 Jeremy Chan, MediaCorp actor
 Hayley Woo, MediaCorp actress
 Jayley Woo, MediaCorp actress

Sports
 Fandi Ahmad, Singapore national footballer 
 Safuwan Baharudin, Singapore national footballer

Politics
 Wong Kan Seng, Deputy Prime Minister of Singapore (2005–2011)

References

External links
 ITE website

1992 establishments in Singapore
Educational institutions established in 1992
Education in Singapore
Institutes of Technical Education in Singapore
Statutory boards of the Singapore Government
Vocational education in Singapore